Hawthorne Valley Waldorf School (HVWS) is an independent co-educational Waldorf day school set in the foothills of the Taconic Mountains in Ghent, Columbia County, New York, USA. The school offers classes from pre-kindergarten to grade 12. It is accredited by the New York State Association of Independent Schools and by the Association of Waldorf Schools of North America.

Founded in 1973, the school is one of the oldest and largest of the approximately 170 independent Waldorf Education schools in North America. The first high school class graduated in 1983.

The high school has a boarding program for students from other schools. It currently enrolls students from Afghanistan, Canada, China, several European nations and Mexico.

Curriculum
The school follows an interdisciplinary approach based on the Waldorf curriculum, with a strong emphasis on English, mathematics and science skills and on art, music and intercultural understanding. The high school curriculum is college preparatory.

Situated on an organic biodynamic farm, all grades at the school have classes that integrate farm science (biology, economics, nutrition) with their curriculum. In 3rd and 9th grade, HVWS students spend a week directly learning at the farm.

The lower school offers the EARTH program for students who might not thrive in a traditional classroom environment. This program combines a land-based and classroom curriculum.

Events
The school's annual public events include:
 The Fall Farm Festival (the second Sunday of October)
 The Yuletide Fair (the first Saturday of December)
 The Spring Fair and May Day Celebration (the first Saturday of May)

Sport
HVWS competes with public and private schools in cross-country, volleyball and basketball. It also fields club soccer teams for boys and girls.
 In 2008, the HVWS varsity cross-country team won the New York State Class D cross-country championship.
 In 2009, the HVWS varsity cross-country team finished third in the New York State Class D cross-country championship.

Larger community
HVWS is a branch of the Hawthorne Valley Association, a not-for-profit organization dedicated to social renewal through education, agriculture and the arts.

External links 
 Hawthorne Valley Waldorf School

Educational institutions established in 1973
Private elementary schools in New York (state)
Private middle schools in New York (state)
Private high schools in New York (state)
Student exchange
Waldorf schools in the United States
Schools in Columbia County, New York
1973 establishments in New York (state)